Fakakakai is a settlement on Haʻano Island, Tonga. It falls within the Haʻapai island grouping. The town has a population of 150.

See also 
 List of islands and towns in Tonga

References

Populated places in Tonga
Haʻapai